Michael Pillay (born 10 November 1955) is a Seychellois former boxer and a founding member of the Seychelles Olympians Association.

Pillay competed in the men's welterweight category at the 1980 Olympic Games. In the first round he defeated Ole Svendsen of Denmark on points (4–1), but suffered a knock-out in round two whilst fighting against Mehmet Bogujevci from Yugoslavia.

References

Seychellois male boxers
1955 births
Living people
Olympic boxers of Seychelles
Boxers at the 1980 Summer Olympics
Welterweight boxers
Seychellois people of Indian descent